Howes Mill is an unincorporated community in eastern Dent County, in the U.S. state of Missouri.

The community is approximately 12.5 miles east of Salem on Missouri Route 32. The Howes Mill spring is two miles to the northeast on the West Fork of Huzzah Creek.

History
A post office called Howes Mill was established in 1859, and remained in operation until 1957. The community was named after Tom Howe, the proprietor of a local mill.

References

Unincorporated communities in Dent County, Missouri
Unincorporated communities in Missouri